The Big Pineapple Music Festival is held annually at the Big Pineapple Landmark, in Woombye, Queensland, Australia. The festival features a range of artists from a variety of genres and first occurred on 21 April 2013 with over 8,000 tickets purchased. The festival was initially developed by the new Big Pineapple landmark owners, in an attempt to pull the business out of bankruptcy. From 2016-2019, the festival has repeatedly sold out, with the 2019 Big Pineapple Music Festival reporting a record attendance of 16,000 people. The Big Pineapple Music Festival has consecutively won the ‘People’s Choice Award Festival of the Year’ for 2018 and 2019 at the Queensland Music Awards. 

The Big Pineapple Music Festival showcases emerging and established Australian artists, with the occasional international act. Noteworthy acts that have performed on Big Pineapple Music Festival's stages include Peking Duk, Hayden James, Bliss N Eso, Allday, Vera Blue, Touch Sensitive, PNAU, Hermitude, John Butler Trio, Birds of Tokyo and Grinspoon. 

Festival organisers had plans to expand the festival to a two-day event in 2020, but the event was cancelled in 2020 due to restrictions imposed when the COVID-19 pandemic occurred.

Description 
The Big Pineapple Music Festival is held annually in Woombye, Queensland, Australia. The festival was developed by new owners of the Big Pineapple landmark, as a turnaround venture of a broader strategic plan, to help the business emerge from bankruptcy. The festival first occurred on 21 April 2013. Since its debut in 2013 the festival has occurred annually. However, from 2014–present the festival has taken place mostly at the end of autumn, during the second half of May. In recent years, the festival has recorded attendance above 15000, with the 2016, 2017 and 2018 festivals selling out. In 2019, the festival increased the number of available tickets to 16,000 and sold out in just two weeks.

History

Venue 
The Big Pineapple in Woombye is a part of a "big" group of Australian tourist attractions. Alongside the Big Pineapple is Coffs Harbour's ‘Big Banana’, Ballina's ‘Big Prawn’ and Goulburn's ‘Big Merino’.  The Big Pineapple comprises a 170-hectare site, with a total capacity for 16,000 people. The Big Pineapple went into liquidation in the 2000s and was purchased by Brad Rankin and Peter Kendall in 2011. In 2017, the pair lodged a development application for the Big Pineapple with the Sunshine Coast Regional Council. The application contained plans to expand the Big Pineapples current facilities by developing a hotel with 120 rooms, a potential brewery/winery, food hub and additional camping facilities. The development application has been approved by the Sunshine Coast Regional Council and the Big Pineapple is set to undergo a significant refurbishment valued at $6.8 million. The Queensland Government is providing funding equal to $2.5 million, to support the crucial upgrades of the refurbishment such as Wi-Fi, kiosk and online ticketing and extensive landscaping. The development plan is estimated to take 10 years to complete and will include glamorous camping, eco-villas, a hotel and nature walks through the food preparation hub. The redevelopment will debut a tree top challenge, as well as host more music events and a regional food event. The Tourism Industry Development Minister has advised the project will attract 160,000 extra visitors and pump approximately 4.5 million in the local economy annually.

Music Festival 
The Big Pineapple Music Festival was first held on 20 April 2013 and has taken place annually since. In 2013, over 8000 tickets were purchased by people from Brisbane, Gold Coast, Adelaide, Perth and Cairns. In exchange for a free ticket, 200 people volunteered to assist with running and cleaning up the festival. The Big Pineapple Music Festivals in 2016, 2017, 2018 and 2019 sold out, with all available tickets being purchased before the festival date. This year's Big Pineapple Music Festival set a new record for the time taken to sell out, with all 16,000 available tickets purchased within two weeks of being on sale.

Future 
The owners and organisers of the festival contacted Tourism Queensland and requested permission to expand the length of the festival from one day to two days. This request was approved and the festival organisers  planned to deliver the first two-day Big Pineapple Music Festival in 2020.

In 2020 the event was initially postponed from May to November 2020, due to Federal government restriction of non-essential event numbers to 500 maximum, imposed when the COVID-19 pandemic began, it was then cancelled in August. The 2021 festival went ahead as scheduled on 22 May.

Line ups

2013 

 Grinspoon
 Birds of Tokyo 
 Regurgitator
British India
 Black Seeds
 Hermitude
 Ash Grunwald 
 OKA
 Bobby ALU 
 Kingswood
Sticky Fingers
Chance Waters
Dialectrix
 Cheap Fakes 
 Andy Dub
 The Leisure Bandits

2014

Bliss N Eso
The Living End
Art Vs Science
Spiderbait
Alison Wonderland
 Opiuo
Funkoars
Diafrix
Kim Churchill
 Tuka 
 Kat Fitz & Cara 
Redcoats
 Kingfisha 
 Mason Rack 
 Mr Hill & Rahjconkas
 Drawcard 
 Band of Frequencies 
 Cheap Fakes 
 Ashleigh Mannix 
 Lurch & Chief 
 Total Eclipse 
 Rattraps 
 The Hi-Boys 
 Generik 
 Ribongia 
 Mouvment 
 Blackdiamond 
 The Brains Trust 
 Hope Springs 
 Jasti 
 The Tea Society 
Young Franco
Dead Letter Circus

2015

The John Butler Trio
The Jezabels
Jebediah
Violent Soho
Thundamentals
 Drawcard
 The Hi Boys
Dallas Frasca
Dune Rats
 Timberwolf
 The Belligerents
Sahara Beck
 The Floating Bridges
 MC Wheels
 Coin Banks
Sarah Howells
 Karl S. Williams
 Dubarray
 The Dawn Chorus
 In2Nation
 The Black Catapult

2016

RUFUS
You Am I
Hermitude
The Veronicas
The Smith Street Band
DMA's
Tkay Maidza
Regurgitator
 Holy Moly
 The Delta Riggs
 Yahtzel
 Opiuo
 KLP (DJ set)
 Yeo
The Bennies
 Tijuana Cartel
Dylan Joel
Odd Mob
 Mathas
Sahara Beck
 GG Magree
 The Ninjas
 The Floating Bridges
 Lyall Moloney
 Transvaal Diamond Syndicate
 The Brains Trust
 Khan Harrison Band
 Gurps Band
 Buck Dean and The Green Lips
 Batchelo
 Jenga

2017

Birds of Tokyo
Peking Duk
Northlane
Cloud Control
The Veronicas
City Calm Down
Ldru
Dz Deathrays
Urthboy
Vera Blue
 High Tropics
 Arpier
 The Hi Boys
 Harts
Alex Lahey
Boo Seeka
Polish Club
Ngaiire
Sampa The Great
 Bootleg Rascal
 Jack River
Nicole Millar
 Pierce Brothers
 Barefoot
 In2nation
 Buck Dean & The Green Lips
Citizen Kay
 Bec Sandridge
 Benson
 Moonbase
 Fortunes
Winston Surfshirt
Ocean Alley
West Thebarton Brothel Party
 Gold Member
 Hey Geronimo
 Safia
 Bearfoot 
 Fight Ibis (winner of Triple J's Unearth 2017 competition).

2018

Violent Soho
Illy
Dune Rats
The Preatures
Allday
Hayden James
Cub Sport
 Cog
Butterfingers
 Crooked Colours
 Myxen
 POW! Negro
 Psychedelic Porn Crumpets
E^ST
 Kilter
Kim Churchill
Slumberjack
 Luke Million
 Northeast Party House
ShockOne
Tired Lion
 Arno Faraji
Carmouflage Rose
 Rackett
 Suidgenini
 The Moving Stills
 Clews
 Doolie
 Greta Stanley
 Hobo Magic
Imbi The Girl
Kira Puru
 Maddy Jane
 Moody Beach
 Mookhi
 Pandamic
 The Vanns
 Fragile Animals (winner of Triple J's Unearthed 2018 competition)

2019

Peking Duk
Broods
PNAU
Vera Blue
Thundamentals
Karnivool
 Benson
Confidence Man
Hands Like Houses
Hatchie
Last Dinosaurs
 Joy
 KLP
 Running Touch
Rakeem Miles
Kota Banks
The Chats
 Laurel
Touch Sensitive
Mallrat
West Thebarton
Stand Atlantic
Tkay Maidza
Wafia
 Austen
 Mane
 Gold Member
Tones and I
 Fight Ibis
 The Dreggs

Arrests

2013 
The first Big Pineapple Music Festival was patrolled by 30 Queensland Police Officers and accompanying drug-detection dogs. Upon entry, Police officers carried out searches on approximately 1000 patrons. These searches resulted in 40 drug detections. 15 of the 40 individuals detected were arrested on drug offenses, with possession of MDMA (ecstasy) accounting for half of the charges.

2014 
In 2014, the Police used drug-detection dogs to passively searched 1100 of the 8000 people that attended the Big Pineapple Music Festival. This resulted in a detection rate of 7.2%, with 80 people testing positive for drugs. Of these 80, 18 law breakers were identified and charged with 19 drug offenses. 18 people were charged with possession of dangerous drugs, including MDMA, ecstasy, cannabis, methylamphetamine and cocaine, and 1 person received an additional charge of possession of a dangerous weapon (knife). Police also conducted a total of 260 random breath tests on and around Nambour Connection Road on the day of the festival, with no positive readings recorded.

2016 
In 2016, the Police Force conducted searches of between 1000 and 2000 people entering the Big Pineapple Music Festival. Drug-detection dogs were used during these searches and detected 18 patrons. Further investigation of the 18 patrons resulted in 21 drug related offenses being recorded collectively.

2018 
In 2018, the Queensland Police force executed drug raids on two homes in Warana and Parrearra, a few days before the sixth Big Pineapple Music Festival. The officers found an ounce of cocaine, MDMA crystals, over 200 MDMA pills and close to $8000 cash. Police allege the illicit substances were destined to be sold to patrons at the Big Pineapple Music Festival. A 20-year-old man found at the Warana property was charged with 12 offences, and a 23-year-old man at the Parrearra home was charged with 4 drug offences. Drug-detection dogs were utilised by Police officers to passively search 1000 to 2000 of the 14000 festival patrons (Lyons, 2018). 17 people were identified and charged with possession of drugs.

2019 
In 2019, the Queensland Police Force employed uniform officers, drug-detection dogs and undercover officers to monitor the Big Pineapple Music Festival. Police officers and accompanying drug-detection dogs searched approximately 1000 patrons, of which 45 people were arrested on drug-related charges. The charges included possession of cocaine, LSD, marijuana, MDMA and amphetamine.

Awards

Queensland Music Awards
The Queensland Music Awards (previously known as Q Song Awards) are annual awards celebrating Queensland, Australia's brightest emerging artists and established legends. They commenced in 2006.
 
|-
| 2018
| Big Pineapple Music Festival
| People's Choice Festival of the Year 
| 
|-
|2019
| Big Pineapple Music Festival
| People's Choice Festival of the Year 
| 
|-
| 2020
| Big Pineapple Music Festival
| People's Choice Festival of the Year 
| 
|-

References 

Tourist attractions on the Sunshine Coast, Queensland
Music festivals in Australia
2013 establishments in Australia